Gavin Fox may refer to:

 Gavin Fox (musician), Irish bass player
 Gavin Fox (actor), Canadian actor